Andy Campbell (born 3 October 1959) is a former speedway rider from England.

Speedway career 
Campbell reached the final of the British Speedway Championship in 1985. He rode in the top tier of British Speedway from 1979–1990, riding for various clubs.

References 

1959 births
Living people
British speedway riders
Belle Vue Aces riders
Berwick Bandits riders
Exeter Falcons riders
Glasgow Tigers riders
King's Lynn Stars riders
Poole Pirates riders
Wimbledon Dons riders